Andy Nguyen may refer to:

 Andy Nguyen (born 1993)
 Anthony Nguyen